Wiesengrund (Lower Sorbian Łukojce) is a municipality in the district of Spree-Neiße, in Lower Lusatia, Brandenburg, Germany.

History
From 1815 to 1947, the constituent localities of Wiesengrund were part of the Prussian Province of Brandenburg. From 1952 to 1990, they were part of the Bezirk Cottbus of East Germany. On 31 December 2001, the municipality of Wiesengrund was formed by merging the municipalities of Gahry, Gosda, Jethe, Mattendorf and Trebendorf.

Demography

Subdivisions
The city districts are:

 Gahry (Gari)
 Gosda I (Gózna)
 Dubrau (Dubrawa) 
 Klinge (Klinka) 
 Jethe (Jaty)
 Smarso (Smaržow)
 Mattendorf (Matyjojce) 
 Trebendorf (Trjebejce)

The Mattendorf district (Matyjojce) is a designated Sorbian settlement area (Sorbisches Siedlungsgebiet).

References

Populated places in Spree-Neiße